Lagocheirus praecellens is a species of longhorn beetles of the subfamily Lamiinae. It was described by Bates in 1872, and is known from Nicaragua and Panama.

References

Beetles described in 1872
Lagocheirus